The Tetsuo Harano Tunnels are a pair of highway tunnels passing through the Ko‘olau Range on the island of O‘ahu.

The tunnels are named for Tetsuo Harano, a former state highways administrator who served the state for 52 years. The tunnels were briefly renamed for the former Governor of Hawaii John A. Burns but due to the efforts of Yoshie Tanabe and Kongo Kimura, were restored to the original name by Governor Linda Lingle after she took office.

Also nearby are the smaller Hospital Rock Tunnels.

References 

Road tunnels in Hawaii
Transportation in Honolulu County, Hawaii
Buildings and structures in Honolulu County, Hawaii
Interstate Highways in Hawaii